Brian Hepper (born 11 December 1946) is a former Australian rules footballer who played with Fitzroy in the Victorian Football League (VFL). He is the cousin of Fitzroy footballer Wally Clark.

Notes

External links 
		

1946 births
Living people
Australian rules footballers from Victoria (Australia)
Fitzroy Football Club players